Fos-sur-Mer (literally Fos on Sea; Provençal: Fòs) is a commune in the Bouches-du-Rhône department in southern France.

Geography
The city has  of sand beach.

Population

Economy
Fos is the site of a major port development operated by the Autonomous Port of Marseille. The facilities include container handling terminals and a gas (methane) terminal. The waterside location of the industrial zone is attractive to heavy industry including steel. The steel group ArcelorMittal has its Sollac Méditerranée plant here. The presence of the steel, chemistry and oil industries means that pollution levels are high.

Sports
Fos-sur-Mer is home to Fos Provence Basket which plays its home games at the 2,000 seat Complexe sportif Parsemain.

See also
Communes of the Bouches-du-Rhône department

References

Communes of Bouches-du-Rhône
Mediterranean port cities and towns in France
Bouches-du-Rhône communes articles needing translation from French Wikipedia